Tony Bull may refer to:
 Tony Bull (footballer)
 Tony Bull (wrestler)